Alfred Mohr (born 21 January 1913, date of death unknown) was an Austrian cyclist. He competed in the 1000m time trial and the tandem events at the 1936 Summer Olympics.

References

External links
 

1913 births
Year of death missing
Austrian male cyclists
Olympic cyclists of Austria
Cyclists at the 1936 Summer Olympics
Cyclists from Vienna
20th-century Austrian people